Darby and Tarlton were an American early country music duo, who achieved some level of success in the late 1920s. The duo consisted of Tom Darby (born August 25, 1891 Columbus, Georgia - died August 20, 1971) and Jimmie Tarlton, (born John James Rimbert Tarlton, May 8, 1892 Cheraw, South Carolina - died November 29, 1979 Phenix City, Alabama).

Biography
Tarlton grew up on a farm in Chesterfield County, South Carolina, learning folk songs from an early age. His parents were sharecroppers and he had to help out with the chores. He still managed to find the time to learn the slide guitar and banjo. After working as a street musician in the 1920s, Tarlton met Frank Ferera, who taught him how to play the Hawaiian guitar. Tarlton soon moved to Columbus, Georgia, where he met Tom Darby. They began performing together and shortly, they were offered a chance to make a recording for Columbia Records. Two songs were cut on April 5, 1927, and the recording sold well enough to allow a second recording session. On November 10, 1927, they recorded four songs, among them "Birmingham Jail" and "Columbus Stockade Blues". The two songs, coupled on one record, became the duo's biggest hits selling more than 200,000 copies. Darby and Tarlton recorded 63 songs between 1927 and 1933. In 1933, they became hostile towards each other and went their separate ways professionally. Darby did, however, visit Tarlton occasionally.

Tom Darby formed a short lived duo in 1931 together with Jesse Pitts, called The Georgia Wildcats. Darby and Tarlton both retired in 1935. In 1963, Darby and Tarlton reunited to perform in Weracoba Park (known locally as "Lakebottom") when they agreed to be part of the Columbus Symphony Orchestra's opening pops concert.  Thomas P. Darby's nephew, Richard "Ricky" Whitley, claims that he learned guitar from Tom Darby and Jimmy Tarlton.  Darby was quoted as saying in a 1963 interview with The Columbus Enquirer (now known as The Columbus Ledger-Enquirer) regarding the opening pops concert performance that "Tarlton’s fine wife said we sounded even better than before. Made goose pimples come up on her arms, she said."  Darby was drafted during World War I, but was shortly thereafter honorably discharged due to being "unfit to serve" (flat feet).

Darby was married to Alma "Olene" Darby (née Brown) until his death at the Columbus Medical Center, after a long bout with lung cancer.  He was interred in Columbus, Georgia's Riverdale Cemetery in the Veteran's section.  His wife died in 1984 after a brief illness and is buried beside him.  The song "Little Ola" was actually written by Darby as a tribute to his wife ("Olene" Darby was several years his junior).  After retiring from the music business, Darby had other business ventures, including a stint "running moonshine".  He would row a boat filled with moonshine from a small island near Phenix City, Alabama (where his still was located) to the Columbus, Georgia, side across the Chattahoochee River.  A simple yet effective method was employed to avoid prosecution.  If "Olene" saw a "revenooer" (as they were called), she would wave a dark handkerchief.  If it was safe, she would wave a light-colored handkerchief.  On at least one occasion, a "revenooer" had shown up...and a dark-colored handkerchief was waved.  Darby reversed course, rowing back to the Alabama side.  When the agent approached Mrs. Darby, he asked what she was doing.  She replied, "I was waving to my husband."  When asked why he had turned around, she replied, "He must have forgotten something."

During the folk revival of the 1960s, Tarlton performed again.

Original discography

Darby and Tarlton

Jimmie Tarlton

The Georgia Wildcats

References

Other sources
Darby and Tarlton, Liner notes, Booklet, Bear Family Records

Country music duos
Old-time musicians
Musicians from South Carolina
Musical groups established in 1927
20th-century American musicians